Sultana Daku is a 1972 Bollywood drama film directed by Mohammed Hussain. The film stars Helen Jairag Richardson and Dara Singh. This movie is based on a person named Sultana who fought against British imperialists.

Cast 
 Dara Singh
 Ajit
 Helen

Music

See also 

 The Confession of Sultana Daku
 Jagga Jatt
 Phoolan Devi
 Seema Parihar
 Sucha Singh Soorma
 Veerappan

External links 
 

1972 films
1972 crime drama films
1970s Hindi-language films
Indian crime drama films
Films scored by Madan Mohan
Indian films based on actual events
Hindi-language films based on actual events
Indian biographical drama films